The 1970 Rawlings Tennis Classic – Doubles was an event of the 1970 Rawlings Tennis Classic men's tennis tournament that was played at the Dwight Davis Tennis Center in Forest Park in St. Louis, Missouri in the United States< The event was scheduled from May 26 through June 1, 1970 but the final was delayed due to a power outage followed by bad weather at which point the doubles finalists Andrés Gimeno and John Newcombe had to travel to Casablanca, Morocco for the Moroccan Pro Championships. Subsequently, the doubles final was rescheduled to and played on August 24, 1970. The draw comprised 10 teams of which four were seeded. Fourth-seeded Andrés Gimeno and John Newcombe won the doubles title, defeating second-seeded Roy Emerson and Rod Laver in the final, 6–4, 6–2. The final was played indoor at the Washington University Field House due to bad weather.

Seeds

Draw

References

External links
 ITF tournament edition details

Tennis in Missouri
1970 in American tennis